Bibb County Courthouse may refer to:

Bibb County Courthouse (Georgia), Macon, Georgia
Bibb County Courthouse (Alabama), Centreville, Alabama